Anwar Kharral is a fictional character in the television series Skins portrayed by Dev Patel.

Characterisation
Anwar is portrayed as a boy of Pakistani origin. Raised in an Islamic household, Anwar claims to pray five times a day. However, he does not take his religion seriously, as he takes drugs, drinks, partakes in premarital sex and eats pork. He even uses his being a Muslim to get out of certain situations. He is best friends with Maxxie Oliver, although his views on Maxxie's sexual orientation put a strain on their friendship at one point, as he believes that Maxxie's homosexuality goes against his religion. Anwar also laments that as a Muslim boy, he feels he has no choice in his faith.

According to the official website, his favourite things are "tequila, dope, pills, Lupe Fiasco, breasts and X Factor".

According to fellow actors Mike Bailey (who portrays Sid Jenkins) and Hannah Murray (who portrays Cassie Ainsworth), the characterization of Anwar was partly based on the personality of the actor Dev Patel and the role was written specifically for him after he was cast for Skins.

Character history

Series 1
In "Tony", Anwar and Chris are convinced by Maxxie to go to a "big gay night out" with him, believing that there would be many beautiful women there and they would be the only straight men there to have sex with. The night out didn't go as planned and they eventually go to Abigail Stock's party instead. In "Maxxie and Anwar", on a school trip to Russia, he finds himself at odds with Maxxie, who views Anwar's pick-and-choose approach to Islam as hypocritical. He also loses his virginity to a married Russian girl, Anka, whom he, along with Sid Jenkins, believed they were rescuing from her abusive father who turned out to be her husband.

The beginning of the first series finale opens with the celebration of Anwar's 17th birthday and his upcoming party on the same day. Maxxie rings him to wish him a happy birthday and tells Anwar to tell his parents that he is gay or he would not attend the party. Later that night, Anwar's party doesn't start off well, with his uncle playing old 70s and 80s music, and Maxxie refusing to attend the party. While making out with one of his sister's friends, Anwar stops to call Maxxie to introduce her to him. Anwar and Maxxie meet outside the venue, where Mr. Kharral, Anwar's father, spots them. As Mr. Kharral converses with Maxxie, Anwar blurts out that Maxxie is gay. Mr. Kharral seems to ignore this until Maxxie confesses to him mid-conversation. Mr. Kharral, much to the surprise of Anwar and Maxxie, explains that homosexuals are something he does not understand, but would never discriminate against, as he has faith that God will one day enlighten him and make him understand. Mr. Kharral then invites Maxxie to come and eat, repairing the friendship between him and Anwar.

Series 2

In "Sketch", he sleeps with Sketch after Maxxie turns her down. Despite telling Anwar that she always liked him, Sketch still has feelings for Maxxie, as she touches and looks at a picture of him while she has sex with Anwar.

In the next episode it is shown that he and Sketch are continuing their sexual relationship, implying that Anwar may be particularly interested in her. When the two are caught by Sid's Mum, Anwar once again expresses discomfort for his life under a Muslim household, stating that "sex hasn't been invented" in his house. In the episode "Michelle", his relationship with Sketch is discovered by Michelle and Maxxie, who confront Anwar about it due to Sketch's previous behaviour.

In series 2's "Chris", while at Chris' house-warming party Maxxie confronts both Sketch and Anwar about Anwar's recent choice of style which disturbingly mirrors that of Maxxie. Anwar, oblivious to Sketch's designs reacts first in disbelief then informs Sketch that she is dumped.

In the series two finale, Anwar is nervous after he receives his A-Level results in the post, as he has pledged not to open them until after Chris' funeral, even when his mother offers to steam them open. Anwar decides to open them anyway, and his reaction is one of shock, horror and dismay. Unable to go to his friends or his family, Anwar visits Sketch, his ex-girlfriend, and confides to her about them, and she reveals to him that he never gave any thought to his future. She then persuades him that his friends will eventually move on, and suggests they get back together. Anwar leaves before the results can be read out, and Maxxie reveals that the grades were, in fact, two E's and a U. When seeing Maxxie and James off at the bus to London, they persuade him to join them. Excited, he boards the bus, while Sketch watching the bus leave in dismay.

Series 3
Anwar was briefly mentioned in the season 3 episode "Freddie". Cook mentions that he met "some skinny Asian kid named Anwar" busking and asked if he could join him. He then goes on to say that Anwar asked him in turn if he knew the "'buddah buddah cheeeese buddah' routine or something."

References

External links
Anwar Kharral on the official E4 Skins site
 Anwar Kharral on Myspace

Skins (British TV series) characters
Fictional English people
Fictional Pakistani people
Television characters introduced in 2007
Male characters in television
Teenage characters in television 
British male characters in television

pt:Anwar Kharral